= Ville Laine =

Finnish ice hockey player

- Born: February 25, 1989 (age 36); Tampere, Finland
- Height: 5 ft 11 in (180 cm)
- Weight: 176 lb (80 kg; 12 st 8 lb)
- Position: Defence
- Shoots: Left
- SM-liiga team: Ilves
- Playing career: 2010–present

Ville Laine (born February 25, 1989) is a Finnish professional ice hockey player who played with Ilves in the SM-liiga during the 2010–11 season.
